Midway is an unincorporated community in Washington County, Virginia. It lies at an elevation of 2034 feet (620 m).

References

Unincorporated communities in Washington County, Virginia
Unincorporated communities in Virginia